Palaeospheniscus gracilis is a species of the extinct penguin genus Palaeospheniscus. Average individuals, thus, were about the size of the Galapagos penguin.

Description 
This species was long believed to have first been found in Early Oligocene deposits. However, it seems that the type specimen, a tarsometatarsus, was recovered not from Early Oligocene rocks, but was found on top of them, having been displaced there from a later stratum. The location where the bone was found seems to have been near Cabeza Blanca. At any rate, all later specimens were found in the Early Miocene Gaiman Formation; those that have locality data are from the area around Trelew and Gaiman in Chubut Province, Argentina.

Some recent researchers have suggested that this species should be considered a synonym of Palaeospheniscus bergi.

References

Further reading 
 Ameghino, Florentino (1899): [Description of Palaeospheniscus gracilis]. In: Sinopsis geologico-paleontologica (Segundo censo de la República Argentina). Suplemento.: 9. La Plata: La Libertad.
 Simpson, George Gaylord (1946): Fossil penguins. Bull. Am. Mus. Nat. Hist. 87: 7-99. PDF fulltext
 Simpson, George Gaylord (1971): Conspectus of Patagonian fossil penguins. American Museum Novitates 2488: 1-37. PDF fulltext

Palaeospheniscus
Extinct penguins
Miocene birds of South America
Friasian
Santacrucian
Colhuehuapian
Neogene Argentina
Fossils of Argentina
Gaiman Formation
Fossil taxa described in 1899
Taxa named by Florentino Ameghino